is a Japanese politician who was the governor of Ishikawa Prefecture between 1994 and 2022. After his first election, in 1994, he was reelected 6 times. In 2018 he won his seventh term of office.

See also 
 Premium passport

References

External links 
 

1945 births
Living people
Politicians from Hyōgo Prefecture
Kyoto University alumni
Governors of Ishikawa Prefecture